Krondor: The Betrayal is a fantasy novel by American writer Raymond E. Feist. The  first novel  in The Riftwar Legacy, it was first published in November 1998. It is a novelization of the computer game Betrayal at Krondor.

Plot introduction
A moredhel known as Gorath has brought news of deadly forces stirring on the horizon. The Nighthawks have begun murdering again, and a group of six magicians known as The Six are at the root of it all. Tsurani gem smugglers led by The Crawler and traitors to the crown are all plotting the fall of the Kingdom of the Isles. Squires James and Locklear must fend off the reunited moredhel while Gorath and his newly gained friend Owyn seek to aid the magician Pug and the kingdom.

1998 American novels
1998 fantasy novels
American fantasy novels
HarperCollins books
Novels based on Krondor
Novels by Raymond E. Feist